Eightmile Creek is an  tributary of Tenmile Creek in Albany County, New York.  Via Tenmile Creek and Catskill Creek, it is part of the Hudson River watershed. Eightmile Creek runs through the town of Westerlo into the town of Rensselaerville, where it joins Tenmile Creek at the hamlet of Medusa. The creek's source is near Onderdonk Lake by Snyders Corners in Westerlo.

See also
List of rivers of New York

References

Rivers of New York (state)
Rivers of Albany County, New York
Tributaries of the Hudson River